The Rawas River is a river in northern Sumatra, Indonesia, about  northwest of the capital Jakarta It is a tributary of the Musi River.

Geography
The river flows in the southern area of Sumatra with predominantly tropical rainforest climate (designated as Af in the Köppen–Geiger climate classification). The wettest month is December, with an average of  rainfall, and the driest is June, with  rainfall.

See also
List of rivers of Indonesia
List of rivers of Sumatra

References

Rivers of South Sumatra
Rivers of Indonesia